Sam Rapira (born 2 November 1983) is a New Zealand boxing promoter and professional boxer.

Rapira had a very well credentialed amateur career, fighting 70 fights before turning pro. Rapira was his own promoter, promoting every fight he has had in New Plymouth.

Amateur career
Rapira has fought in seventy amateur boxing bouts, fighting local stars like Reece Papuni and Gunnar Jackson, Australian Damien Hooper, and German Champion, Enrice Koelling. Rapira biggest win was at the 2011 Arafura Games where he won the silver medal in the 81 kg division. The biggest upset of the tournament was when Rapira defeated world ranked number one at the time Vijender Singh. Sam Rapira was the captain of the New Zealand Boxing team, which went on to win five Golds and three Silvers.

Professional career

New Zealand dream fights, international fights 2016
In July 2016, Rapira Announced that he will be self promoting his 8th show with Rapira taking on Robert Berridge in the main event. This is one of New Zealand's most talked about dream fight in the light heavyweight weight division. The bout took place at TSB Stadium in September 2016. Berridge won the bout by unanimous decision. After the bout Berridge commented on how poor referee David Craig (who is also President of New Zealand National Boxing Federation) officiated the fight, with the lack of control and not stepping in when there was too much holding or wrestling. On 29 October 2016, it was announced that Rapira would face Ryan Ford on 17 February 2017 for the Vacant UBO World Light Heavyweight Championship. He lost the fight via TKO in the ninth round.

Retirement 2017 - 2018
On 5 April 2017, Rapira announced his retirement fight which will take place on 26 May against undefeated boxer, Tipene Maniapoto. Rapira final undercard will include the debut of Tania Reid going up against Wendy Talbot and Taranaki's Simon Jullen going against Taihiti's Tautu Brillant. A few days before the bout, Rapira announce that the fight was upgraded to a title bout for the PABA title. Rapira won the bout by Unanimous Decision with Maniapoto being knocked down multiple times throughout the bout. On 19th of May 2018, Rapria made his return to the ring to take on Ratu Dawai for the New Zealand National (PBCNZ version) Light Heavyweight title. Rapira lost the fight by TKO when his trainer threw in the towel in round seven, ending the career for Rapira. Since retiring from the ring, Rapira remains an active promoter, putting on regular boxing events throughout the year.

Health problems after boxing 
Since retiring from boxing, Rapira has been diagnosed with Dementia Pugilistica also known as Chronic traumatic encephalopathy. He stated he started feeling the CTE symptoms before his last fight in 2018. Rapira is urging people taking part in combat sports to use the best protective equipment available.

Championships
New Zealand National Boxing Federation
New Zealand National Light Heavyweight Title (174¼ Ibs)
International Boxing Organization
IBO Asia Pacific Light Heavyweight Title (173¾ Ibs)
World Boxing Association
PABA Light Heavyweight Title

Professional boxing record

Personal life and charity work
Born in, New Plymouth, New Zealand, Rapira is the cousin of New Zealand rugby league international, Sam Rapira. Rapira, his brother Jake and their co-owned boxing gym do regular charity work for the community and SPCA. Their biggest contribution is organizing food banks for the winter months and Christmas Season. They donate to the community including the food banks on average a hundred times a month.

Awards and recognitions
2019 Gladrap Boxing Awards Event of the year (Won)

References

External links

  Rapira Boxing Website

1983 births
Living people
New Zealand male boxers
Light-heavyweight boxers
New Zealand professional boxing champions
Sportspeople from New Plymouth
Fighters trained by Lolo Heimuli